Harrod may refer to:

People with the surname Harrod

 Benjamin Morgan Harrod (1837–1912), New Orleans civil engineer
 Billa Harrod (1911–2005), British architectural conservationist, wife of Roy
 Charles Digby Harrod (1841–1905), British retailer, son of Charles Henry
 Charles Henry Harrod (1799–1885), British retailer
 Henry Harrod (1817–1871), English antiquarian
 James Harrod (born ), Kentucky pioneer
 Jeffrey Harrod (born 1935), English writer and essayist on politics
 Roy Harrod (1900–1978), English economist
 Tim Harrod (born 1968), American comedy writer
 William Harrod (1753–1819), English printer and antiquary

Given name
 Harrod Blank (born 1963), American documentary filmmaker

Places
 Harrod, Ohio, a village

See also
 Harrods, a London department store
 Harrop (disambiguation)
 Herod (disambiguation)
 Herrod
 Garrod